Rock Bay Marine Provincial Park is a provincial park in British Columbia, Canada, located on the Inside Passage at the junction of Johnstone Strait and Discovery Passage.  The park contains approximately 525 ha.  Rock Bay is located on the shore of Vancouver Island, immediately south of East Thurlow Island.

See also
Rock Bay, British Columbia (community)

References

Provincial parks of British Columbia
Northern Vancouver Island
Central Coast of British Columbia
1995 establishments in British Columbia
Protected areas established in 1995
Marine parks of Canada